Băieții Buni (The Goodfellas, a reference to the 1990 Martin Scorsese movie) is the eighth studio album by Romanian hip hop group B.U.G. Mafia. It was released on December 7, 2003, by Casa Productions/Cat Music in Romania and it was the first studio album to be released by the group on their own imprint, Casa Productions.

Track listing
"Intro"
"Să Sară-N Aer"
"Flocea Din Socului" feat. Flocea
"În Anii Ce Au Trecut" 
"Gherila PTM" feat. Villy
"Discuție Pe Dig" feat. Primo
"Iarbă Și Alcool" feat. XXL, 10 Grei, Mashat, Luchian & Primo
"Pula Mea..." feat. Brasco
"Muzica De Noapte" feat. M&G
"O Lume Nebună, Nebună De Tot" feat. Villy
"La Noroc"
"Românește"
"Garda" feat. Mario
"Exces Perves" feat. XXL, 10 Grei & Villy
"În Oglindă" feat. Primo
"Drumu' Spre Pârnaie"
"Swamp"
"40 Km/H" feat. Mary
"Cine Are Cu Noi"
"Față-N Față 2"
"Prin Cartieru' Minunat"
"Outro"

References

External links
 Băieţii Buni at Discogs

2003 albums
B.U.G. Mafia albums